Nanon is an operetta by Richard Genée. The libretto was freely adapted from Nanon, Ninon et Maintenon, of Emmanuel Théaulon and Armand d'Artois by F. Zell and R. Genee.  10 March 1877 at the Theater an der Wien in Vienna.

Recording 
, Heinz Hoppe, Kurt Marschner, Orchester des Nordwestdeutschen Rundfunks Hamburg, Richard Müller-Lamperts / 1955

References

1877 operas
Operas
Operettas
German-language operettas